HMS Amethyst was a modified Black Swan-class sloop of the Royal Navy. She was laid down by Alexander Stephen and Sons of Linthouse, Govan, Scotland on 25 March 1942, launched on 7 May 1943 and commissioned on 2 November 1943, with the pennant number U16. After the Second World War she was modified and redesignated as a frigate, and renumbered F116.

Second World War
During the Second World War, Amethyst was deployed mostly on anti-submarine patrols and escort duties. She attacked and sank the U-boat  with depth charges on 20 February 1945. The action took place in the North Atlantic, south of Waterford, and resulted in the loss of all 49 of the U-boat's crew.

The British Admiralty withdrew this credit in a post-war reassessment.

The Yangtze Incident

On 20 April 1949, Amethyst was on her way from Shanghai to Nanking (now Nanjing) when she was fired upon by the People's Liberation Army, known as the Amethyst Incident. Amethyst was trapped in China until 30 July 1949, when she escaped under cover of darkness.

For the 1957 film Yangtse Incident: The Story of HMS Amethyst, Amethyst was brought out of reserve to play herself. As the engines were no longer operational, her sister ship  was used for shots of the ship moving. Amethyst was scrapped shortly after the filming was finished.

See also
Simon (cat)
Lieutenant-Commander Kerans

References

References

Further reading

 Leslie Frank - Yangtse River Incident 1949: The Diary of Coxswain Leslie Frank: HMS Amethyst - Yangtse River 19/4/49 to 31/7/49 (2004) 
Edwyn Gray - Frigate Under Fire: HMS Amethyst's 100 Days of Hell (1987)
 Malcolm H. Murfett - Hostage on the Yangtze: Britain, China, and the Amethyst Crisis of 1949 (1991)

External links
 Britain's Small Wars' account of the Amethyst Incident
 Friends of the Four Ships 191 members Up-dated 2008
 Simon, (a cat) of HMS Amethyst, awarded the Dickin Medal.
 MaritimeQuest HMS Amethyst pages
 MaritimeQuest HMS Concord and the escape of the Amethyst

 

Black Swan-class sloops
World War II sloops of the United Kingdom
Sloops of the United Kingdom
Ships built on the River Clyde
1943 ships
Korean War sloops of the United Kingdom
Maritime incidents in 1949